Compsoctena delocrossa is a moth in the family Eriocottidae. It was described by Edward Meyrick in 1921. It is found in South Africa and Zimbabwe.

Its wingspan is about 25 mm. The forewings are grey, with the tips of the scales dark fuscous and with irregular indistinct dark fuscous transverse striae, in the cell more broken into dots. The area of the cell and median area of the costa is somewhat suffused with darker but undefined. The hindwings are grey.

References

Moths described in 1921
Compsoctena
Insects of Zimbabwe
Lepidoptera of South Africa